Fruity Frank is a 1984 video game for the Amstrad CPC and MSX home computers. Produced by Kuma Software and authored by Steve Wallis with graphics by his brother Sean Wallis. The gameplay is very similar to Mr. Do!, though the story involves Frank protecting a garden from invading monsters.

Gameplay 
The player has to collect the fruits lying around the garden while avoiding touching the monsters. Apples can be pushed on these to kill them and offer temporary respite. Monsters can also be killed by throwing a bouncing apple pip at them. When all pieces of fruit have been collected the player proceeds to the next level. Each level is identifiable by a different colour background and a new jocular tune.

There are four types of enemies:

the yellow "big nose", slow: 20 points by shooting, 40 points by squashing
the violet "eggplant", fast, digging: 50 points by shooting, 100 points by squashing
the red "strawberry", very fast, digging: 100 points by shooting, 200 points by squashing
the green (spelling "Bonus")

Every 1000 points, Frank gains an extra life, with a maximum of two.

Music 
Music in the game is inspired from traditional English songs and rhymes.
 
Level 1 : "A Life on the Ocean Wave" (Royal Marines anthem)
Level 2 : "Where Have You Been All the Day, Billy Boy" (Irish version)
Level 3 : ???
Level 4 : "Sweet Molly Malone"
Level 5 : "The Jolly Beggar"
Level 6 : "My Bonnie Lies over the Ocean"
Level 7 : "London Bridge Is Falling Down"

References

External links 
 Fruity Frank at CPC Zone
 Website of the creator of the game Steven Wallis

MSX games
Amstrad CPC games
1984 video games
Video games developed in the United Kingdom
Action video games
Video game clones